Cedarhurst may refer to:

Cedarhurst, New York, a village in Nassau County, New York
Cedarhurst (LIRR station), a railroad station in the village
Cedarhurst, also known as Cordenio Severance House, a historic mansion in Minnesota
Cedarhurst, a historic Gothic Revival residence also known as the Sherwood Bonner House in the East Holly Springs Historic District

See also
Cedarhurst Cut-off, a former rail line
Cedarhurst School, in Hamden, Connecticut